Clifty may refer to:

 Clifty, Arkansas
 Clifty, Kentucky
 Clifty, West Virginia

See also
 Big Clifty, Kentucky